The E.C. Houston House is a historic two-story house in Tekamah, Nebraska. It was built by Joseph Wixer in 1904-1905 for E. C. Houston, and designed in the Classical Revival style. Since 1985, it has housed the Burt County Museum. It has been listed on the National Register of Historic Places since March 13, 1986.

References

		
National Register of Historic Places in Burt County, Nebraska
Neoclassical architecture in Nebraska
Houses completed in 1904
1904 establishments in Nebraska
Museums in Burt County, Nebraska
History museums in Nebraska